Canadian Forces Base St. Hubert was a Canadian Forces Base in the city of Saint-Hubert, Quebec. The base began as a civilian airfield in the 1920s and was later also used by RCAF auxiliary (reserve) squadrons, beginning in the mid-1930s. It became a fully-fledged RCAF station early in World War II, being extensively used for training as part of the British Commonwealth Air Training Plan. After the war, it grew into one of the most important air bases in Canada, and remained so for decades.

In its heyday as an operational air force station, it was host to multiple jet fighter squadrons flying the de Havilland Vampire and later the CF 100 in all-weather fighter squadrons, and two Royal Canadian Air Force Reserve Sabre squadrons and two multi-engine transport squadrons. It was the host station to RCAF Air Defence Command Headquarters. It became part of CFB Montreal upon the unification of the Canadian Forces in 1968, with the headquarters now serving as the Mobile Command Headquarters. The main base was decommissioned by the Canadian Forces in the mid-1990s, being downsized to a garrison under the administrative control of CFB Montreal. 438 Tactical Helicopter Squadron operates from the former base's airfield.

History

World War II

RCAF Station St Hubert was a Royal Canadian Air Force (RCAF) airbase established in World War II at the Montréal/Saint-Hubert Airport. The station was home to the British Commonwealth Air Training Plan No. 13 Service Flying Training School (13 SFTS) from 1 September 1941 to February 1944 when it moved to North Battleford, Saskatchewan. It had a relief field located at Farnham, Quebec. It operated the North American Harvard and the Avro Anson as advanced training aircraft. Three runways were listed as follows:

Postwar
As early as 1946, RCAF squadrons previously disbanded overseas the year before following the end of hostilities, were being reformed in Canada. Both regular and auxiliary units were reactivated in St-Hubert. 410 Sqn, a regular RCAF unit on the new British designed Vampire jet fighter, and 401 and 438 (Aux) squadrons flying the Harvard and then also converting to Vampires.

In its heyday as an operational air force station, it was host to multiple jet fighter squadrons flying the de Havilland Vampire and later the CF 100 in all-weather fighter squadrons, and two Royal Canadian Air Force Reserve Sabre squadrons and two multi-engine transport squadrons. It was the host station to RCAF Air Defence Command Headquarters. It became part of CFB Montreal upon the unification of the Canadian Forces in 1968, with the headquarters now serving as the Mobile Command Headquarters. The main base was decommissioned by the Canadian Forces in the mid-1990s, being downsized as a garrison.

Post-decommissioning
The airport remains in use as Montréal/Saint-Hubert Airport.  The married quarters housing area remains under military control.  Several of the buildings were taken over by the city of St-Hubert for their police and civic administration.  Some of the hangars have been converted to motion picture sound stages.  Barracks blocks and dining facilities have either been demolished or converted to commercial spaces.

Operations
A Canadian Forces garrison remains at the airport, including 438 Tactical Helicopter Squadron and 34 Service Battalion.

No longer using the runways, 438 Squadron has separate helipads located next to a hangar on rue Leckie.

New army recruits in the Primary Reserve often take their BMQ (Basic Military Qualification) course under the supervision of 34 Service Battalion at this location.

References

Defunct airports in Quebec
Canadian Forces bases in Quebec
Royal Canadian Air Force stations
Canadian Forces bases in Canada (closed)
Transport in Longueuil
Buildings and structures in Longueuil
Military history of Quebec
Military airbases in Quebec
Airports of the British Commonwealth Air Training Plan
1997 disestablishments in Quebec